A music video director is the head of music video production. The director conceives of videos' artistic and dramatic aspects while instructing the musical act, technical crew, actors, models, and dancers. They may or may not be in collaboration with the musical act.

On November 8, 1992, MTV began listing directors with the artist, song, and record company credits, because music videos had increasingly become an auteur's medium. "The case for the director as music video author is strong. It is the music video director who has principal control of everything that is added to the pre-existing recorded sound text." Directors, including Michel Gondry, Spike Jonze, and F. Gary Gray, have gone on to direct feature films, continuing a trend that had begun earlier with directors such as Lasse Hallström and David Fincher. The most expensive video of all time was directed by Mark Romanek: Michael and Janet Jackson's "Scream" (1995), which cost $7 million to produce. In 2003, Spike Jonze, Chris Cunningham, and Michel Gondry founded the Directors Label.

List
The following list does not include musical artists who have co-directed videos:

See also
Musical film
Grammy Award for Best Concept Music Video
Grammy Award for Best Music Film
Grammy Award for Best Music Video
Grammy Award for Best Performance Music Video
Post-production
Videography

Sources

External links
 The Internet Music Video Database
 The tvc director global database

 
Directors
Filmmaking occupations
Lists of people by filmmaking occupation